Astarac is a region in Gascony, a county in the Middle Ages. Astarac was formed as a county out of the partition of the Duchy of Gascony: following the death of García II Sánchez of Gascony, the duchy  was partitioned between his sons, with Arnold I, the youngest son, receiving Astarac.

Its principal cities are Mirande, Masseube, Miélan, Tournay, Pavie, Idrac-Respaillès, Castelnau-Barbarens, Berdoues, Ponsampère, Mont-d'Astarac, Miramont-d'Astarac, Laas d'Astarac, and Fontrailles.

Counts
Dates should be approached with extreme caution. Usually the exact dates of accession and death are unknown and only floruit dates can be provided. Further, the sources do not always give the same dates.

Count of Asterac
 926960 Arnold I Nonat
 960before 975 , son
 Before 9751022/23 , son
 1022/23 –  William, son
  – after 1099 Sancho I, son
 After 1099 – 1142 , son
 1142 – bef. 1153 Sancho II, son
 bef. 1153 – c.1176 Bohemond, brother
 1174 – 1182 Bernard II, nephew
 1183 – ???? Marquesa, cousin, co-countess
 1183 – ???? Beatrice, sister, co-countess
 ???? – 1233 Centule I, son
 1233 – 1249 Centule II, son
 1249 – 1291 Bernard III, brother
 1291 – 1300 Centule III, son
 1300 – 1324 Bernard IV, son
 1324 – 1326 Bernard V, son
 1326 – 1331 Amanieu, brother
 1331 – 1363 Centule IV, son
 1363 – 1403 John I, son
 1398 – 1410 John II, son
 1410 – 1458 John III, son
 1458 – 1511 John IV, son
 1511 – 1569 Martha, daughter

Count of Asterac, Candale and Benauges
 1511 – 1536 Gaston, husband
 ???? – 1528 Charles, son
 1528 John I, brother
 1528 – 1571 Frederick, brother
 1571 John II, son
 1571 – 1572 Henry, son
 1572 – 1593 Margaret, daughter

References

 
  By .
 
 

Former provinces of France
Basque history